Steady may refer to:
Steady state, a concept used in math and sciences where variables are time-constant
Steady flow, a condition of flow that does not change with time
 Steady (album), a 2006 album by Jim Bianco
Steady (album), a 2022 album by Sloan
 "Steady", a 2018 song by Bebe Rexha featuring Tory Lanez from the album Expectations

See also 
 Steady state (disambiguation)
 Unsteady (disambiguation)